Articles on Welsbach include:

 Alois Auer Ritter von Welsbach
 Carl Auer von Welsbach
 Welsbach seeding

See also
 Gas mantle